The 1992–93 Romanian Hockey League season was the 63rd season of the Romanian Hockey League. Five teams participated in the league, and Steaua Bucuresti won the championship.

Regular season

External links 
 Season on hockeyarchives.info

1992-93
Romanian
Rom